Binevenagh is a mountain in County Londonderry, Northern Ireland. It marks the western extent of the Antrim Plateau formed around 60 million years ago by molten lava. The plateau and steep cliffs extend for over 6 miles across the peninsula of Magilligan and dominate the skyline over the villages of Bellarena, Downhill, Castlerock and Benone beach. The area has been classified as both an Area of Special Scientific Interest and as an Area of Outstanding Natural Beauty (AONB). The total area of the AONB is 138 km².

The Bishop's Road, named after the Bishop of Derry, extends across the plateau. Notable features include the Mussenden Temple and a cliff top viewing area on the Bishop's Road giving good views over Lough Foyle and across Inishowen in County Donegal.

Sport
Gliding - the Ulster Gliding Club uses the slopes for gliders.
Hang gliding and Paragliding - the slopes are used for soaring by the Ulster Hang gliding and Paragliding Club (UHPC).
Fishing - an artificial lake at the top of the mountain is used for trout fishing.
Motorsport - the Coleraine & District Motor Club run the Eagles Rock hillclimbing event during the month of July.

Railway access
The trains on the Belfast-Derry railway line, run by Northern Ireland Railways (NIR), call at Bellarena railway station between Waterside railway station, in Derry, and Castlerock railway station. Trains continue from Castlerock to Coleraine railway station and other stations to Belfast Central and Belfast Great Victoria Street.

Plane crash
On 24 June 1944 a Royal Air Force Consolidated B-24 Liberator (FL977) of No. 5 Squadron RAF was returning to RAF Ballykelly after a combat mission over Iceland. The aircraft crashed into Binevenagh during its third attempt to land, killing all nine crewmembers onboard.

References

External links
 Binevenagh Area of Outstanding Natural Beauty

Marilyns of Northern Ireland
Mountains and hills of County Londonderry
Special Areas of Conservation in Northern Ireland
Northern Ireland Environment Agency properties
Protected areas of County Londonderry
Volcanism of Northern Ireland
Aviation accidents and incidents locations in Northern Ireland